Samuel Boutal (born 22 November 1969) is a French former professional footballer who played as a striker or attacking midfielder.

Boutal helped Troyes become one of the winners of the 2001 UEFA Intertoto Cup. In the final Troyes beat Newcastle United on away goals after the second leg finished 4–4 at St James' Park; Boutal scored two of Troyes' goals.

Boutal had a brief spell at Scottish side Kilmarnock, joining them in 2002. He scored on his debut against Dundee but was released in January 2003 after no further goals.

Honours
Troyes
 UEFA Intertoto Cup: 2001

References

External links
 
 

1969 births
Living people
French footballers
French sportspeople of Cameroonian descent
Footballers from Bordeaux
Association football midfielders
Red Star F.C. players
Stade Malherbe Caen players
ES Troyes AC players
Kilmarnock F.C. players
Stade de Reims players
Tours FC players
Ligue 1 players
Ligue 2 players
Scottish Premier League players
Pau FC players
French expatriate footballers
French expatriate sportspeople in Scotland
Expatriate footballers in Scotland
French expatriate sportspeople in China
Expatriate footballers in China